These were the rosters of the 10 teams competing at the 2011 FIBA Americas Championship.

Group A

Brazil

|}
| valign="top" |
 Head coach

Legend
nat field describes country of last club  before the tournament
Age field is age on August 30, 2011
|}

Canada

|}
| valign="top" |
 Head coach

Legend
nat field describes country of last club  before the tournament
Age field is age on August 30, 2011
|}

Cuba

|}
| valign="top" |
 Head coach

Legend
nat field describes country of last club  before the tournament
Age field is age on August 30, 2011
|}

Dominican Republic

|}
| valign="top" |
 Head coach

Legend
nat field describes country of last club  before the tournament
Age field is age on August 30, 2011
|}

Venezuela

|}
| valign="top" |
 Head coach

Legend
nat field describes country of last club  before the tournament
Age field is age on August 30, 2011
|}

Group B

Argentina
 

|}
| valign="top" |
 Head coach
 Julio Lamas
 Assistant coach(es)
 Gonzalo García
 Néstor García
Legend
nat field describes country of last club  before the tournament
Age field is age on August 30, 2011
|}

Panama

|}
| valign="top" |
 Head coach

Legend
nat field describes country of last club  before the tournament
Age field is age on August 30, 2011
|}

Paraguay

|}
| valign="top" |
 Head coach

Legend
nat field describes country of last club  before the tournament
Age field is age on August 30, 2011
|}

Puerto Rico

|}
| valign="top" |
 Head coach

Legend
nat field describes country of last club  before the tournament
Age field is age on August 30, 2011
|}

Uruguay

|}
| valign="top" |
 Head coach

Legend
nat field describes country of last club  before the tournament
Age field is age on August 30, 2011
|}

External links
 Team site
 2011 FIBA Americas Championship at FIBA.com

2011
squads